Walter William Weiss (born November 28, 1963) is an American former professional baseball shortstop and manager and current bench coach for the Atlanta Braves. He played in Major League Baseball (MLB) from 1987 through 2000 for the Oakland Athletics, Florida Marlins, Colorado Rockies, and Atlanta Braves. He managed the Rockies from 2013 through 2016. Weiss won the  Rookie of the Year award. He was also a member of the  National League All-Star Team.

Early career
Initially drafted by the Baltimore Orioles in the 10th round of the  amateur draft, Weiss decided to put his professional baseball career on hold and attended the University of North Carolina at Chapel Hill. In 1984, he played collegiate summer baseball with the Wareham Gatemen of the Cape Cod Baseball League where he was named a league all-star and set a league record for most doubles in a season. In June 1985, he was the 12th overall pick in the  draft.

At the age of 23, he made his major league debut for the Oakland Athletics in September . The club was impressed enough with the young shortstop's talent that they traded starter Alfredo Griffin that December, making him their starting shortstop for 1988. His offensive numbers were low (.250 average, three home runs, 39 RBIs and 44 runs scored), but his defensive wizardry helped lead the A's to their first American League pennant since . The 1988 World Series was a rematch of the 1974 matchup, with the Los Angeles Dodgers winning the National League pennant. His costly error in Game 4 helped the Dodgers win the Series in five games, but he was voted American League Rookie of the Year for 1988 as the third consecutive Oakland player to win the award after sluggers José Canseco in 1986 and Mark McGwire in 1987. He also made the 1988 Topps All-Star Rookie Roster.

Mid-career

In  the A's repeated as AL pennant winners, meeting their crosstown rival San Francisco Giants in the 1989 World Series. Although the Series would be overshadowed by the Loma Prieta earthquake on October 17 which delayed play for ten days, Weiss homered and the A's swept the Giants to claim their first world title in fifteen years.

 saw Weiss put up his best offensive numbers to date in hits, runs and batting average, while also stealing nine bases. The A's won their third straight pennant, but Weiss was injured in the 1990 American League Championship Series against the Boston Red Sox and missed Oakland's 1990 World Series loss to the Cincinnati Reds, four games to none.

Weiss spent four years  in Colorado, posting career highs in home runs (8) and RBIs (48).

Later career
In December 1997, he signed with the Atlanta Braves and became their starting shortstop, hitting .280 and making the All-Star team for the only time in his career in 1998.  The Braves finished with 106 wins but lost the NL pennant to the San Diego Padres, but he was slowed by injuries and appeared in less than a hundred games for the first time since 1991. The next season, his decline continued with a disappointing .226 batting average.

While with the Braves, Weiss' family had a health scare when his 3-year old son contracted E. Coli from an Atlanta water amusement park which caused his kidneys to shut down.  Weiss' son made a full recovery.

In Game 3 of the 1999 NLDS against the Houston Astros, however, he made a stunning defensive play to save the season. In the bottom of the tenth, with the bases loaded, one out and the score tied, Tony Eusebio hit a sharp grounder up the middle. Weiss ranged hard to his left, fell on his stomach and threw to home for the force. After the game, he said the ball nearly ripped the glove off his hand. Weiss and the Braves went on to win the game, and with it the division series, on their way to the NL pennant and the 1999 World Series, which they lost to the New York Yankees.

In 2000, he only had 192 at-bats, mostly due to losing the starting shortstop job to the emergent Rafael Furcal, who would go on to win Rookie of the Year just like Weiss twelve years prior. He retired after the season.

Post-playing career
Weiss's charitable contributions have included numerous donations to Watertown High School in Watertown, New York. In addition, the baseball field at his alma mater, Suffern High School, is named after him.

After retiring from the Braves as a player following the 2000 season, he returned to the Rockies as a special instructor and adviser to the front office from 2002 to 2008. He left that job to spend more time with his family, and coach his sons' baseball and football teams.

Weiss was signed on November 7, 2012, to be the manager of the Colorado Rockies. Weiss made the decision to step down as the manager of the Colorado Rockies after four managerial seasons with the club on October 3, 2016. He finished with a record of 283 wins and 365 losses.

The Braves announced that Weiss had been hired as bench coach on November 10, 2017. Weiss, while serving a bench coach for the Atlanta Braves, won a World Series Championship in 2021 after defeating the Houston Astros 4 games to 2 on November 2, 2021.

Managerial record

See also
 List of Colorado Rockies team records

References

External links

SI Article about Weiss' ordeal with ill son
ESPN.com Profile

1963 births
Living people
Atlanta Braves coaches
Atlanta Braves players
Baseball coaches from New York (state)
Baseball players from New York (state)
Colorado Rockies managers
Colorado Rockies players
Florida Marlins players
Huntsville Stars players
Madison Muskies players
Major League Baseball bench coaches
Major League Baseball Rookie of the Year Award winners
Major League Baseball shortstops
Modesto A's players
National League All-Stars
North Carolina Tar Heels baseball players
Oakland Athletics players
People from Suffern, New York
People from Tuxedo, New York
Pocatello Gems players
Tacoma Tigers players
Wareham Gatemen players